Mike Erickson (born January 27, 1963) is an American businessman and perennial political candidate in the U.S. state of Oregon. He was the Republican nominee for the United States House of Representatives in Oregon's 6th congressional district in 2022. Previously, Erickson was the Republican nominee for Oregon's 5th congressional district in 2006 (losing to incumbent Darlene Hooley) and in 2008 (losing to Democrat Kurt Schrader).

Life and career
The son of a police officer, Erickson attended Portland State University where he was a placekicker and punter on Portland State's football team from 1985 to 1988, and ranks second on the school's list for field goals made with 32. Erickson earned a business degree from Portland State in 1987.

After college, he started AFMS Logistics Management Group, which helps companies negotiate competitive shipping contracts. The company made Inc. magazine's list of the 500 fastest-growing companies in the United States twice: in 2004, it was number 319 and in 2005, it was number 350.

Early political career
In 1988, Erickson was the Republican candidate for the Oregon House of Representatives seat representing Tigard, but lost to Democrat Tom Brian. In 1992, Erickson again ran for a different Oregon House seat in Southeast Portland, losing to Kate Brown.

In 2006, Erickson was the Republican nominee for the United States House of Representatives seat in Oregon's 5th congressional district against incumbent Democrat Darlene Hooley, who defeated Erickson.

2008 congressional campaign

In 2008, Hooley announced her retirement from the House. Once again, Erickson ran for the Republican nomination, as did Republican opponent former gubernatorial candidate Kevin Mannix. In the closing weeks of the Republican primary, Mannix mailed 60,000 of his supporters copies of an email that alleged that in 2000, Erickson drove his pregnant girlfriend to a Portland abortion clinic and paid for her to have an abortion. The author of the email, a friend of the pregnant woman, originally sent the email in 2006 during Erickson's first congressional campaign, but had declined to give on-the-record interviews at that time. In May 2008, both women were interviewed by the Portland Tribune about the incident. Erickson denied the charges, stating that he drove a former girlfriend named Tawnya to a doctor's appointment and gave her $300, but did not know she was pregnant or had an abortion. In June, The Oregonian published a story based on claims from the woman herself, in which she described the event in more detail.

Erickson narrowly won the Republican nomination, but Mannix refused to endorse him in the general election, as did Oregon Right to Life. The two Oregon Republican members of Congress, Senator Gordon Smith and Congressman Greg Walden, also declined to endorse Erickson. Erickson lost in the general election to Democrat Kurt Schrader.

2022 congressional campaign 

On March 8, 2022, Erickson filed to run for Oregon's newly created 6th congressional district. He won the Republican primary election and faced Democratic nominee Andrea Salinas in the November 2022 general election. Erickson lost the November general election.

Erickson has filed a defamation against Andrea Salinas over her use of a political ad talking about his arrest in 2016. On Thursday December 1, 2022, the judge overseeing the case allowed the case to continue. This is significant because this case cites Oregon Revised Statute 260.532, which could overturn the election results. Erickson's attorney has stated that Erickson isn't currently seeking to bar Andrea Salinas from her elected office at this time.

References

External links
Campaign website
AFMS Logistics Management Group

1963 births
Businesspeople from Seattle
Candidates in the 2022 United States House of Representatives elections
Living people
Oregon Republicans
Politicians from Tigard, Oregon
Politicians from Lake Oswego, Oregon
Portland State Vikings football players